The Liard Plain is a landform in far northern British Columbia, Canada.  It is located between the Smith River and the Dease Plateau.

See also
Geography of British Columbia
List of physiogeographic regions of British Columbia

References

Landforms of British Columbia
Liard Country